Gabala may refer to:

Places and jurisdictions
 Ancient name of Jableh, a Christian city in Syria and Byzantine (arch)bishopric into the Middle Ages, now a Latin Catholic titular see
Roman Catholic Diocese of Gabala, now a titular see
 Tabala (Lydia), an ancient settlement and bishopric in Lydia
 Gabala (Angola), a town in Angola
 Qabala District, a region of Azerbaijan
 Qabala, a city of Qabala District, Azerbaijan
 Gabala FK, a football club in the above town

Other
 Gabala (moth), a genus of nolid moths
 Gabala Radar Station, an early warning radar station run by Russian Space Forces

See also 
 Gabalas